Proflazepam (Ro10-3580) is a drug which is a benzodiazepine derivative.

See also
List of benzodiazepines

References

Diols
Benzodiazepines
Chloroarenes
GABAA receptor positive allosteric modulators
Lactams
Fluoroarenes